The 1937–38 Estonian Football Championship was the 17th official football league season in Estonia. Eight teams took part in the league six from Tallinn, one from Pärnu and Narva. JS Estonia Tallinn finished first, its fourth consecutive league title.

League table

Results

Top scorers

References

Estonian Football Championship
1937 in Estonian football
1938 in Estonian football
Estonia